Neipperg may refer to:

 Neipperg, a village in the town of Brackenheim, Germany, renowned for its colorful foliage. 
 County of Neipperg, a state of the Holy Roman Empire from 1766, centred on Schwaigern, mediatised to the Kingdom of Württemberg in 1806

People
 Wilhelm Reinhard von Neipperg (1684–1774), Austrian general, count of Neipperg from 1726
 Adam Albert von Neipperg (1775–1829), Austrian general who married Marie Louise, Duchess of Parma, Napoleon's widow
 Erwin von Neipperg (1813–1897), Austrian-Württembergian general
 William Albert of Neipperg, 1st Prince of Montenuovo (1819–1895), Italian prince and Field Marshal Lieutenant of the Austrian Empire